Ashok Shankarappa Kheny is an Indian film producer, actor, director, businessman, politician, and owner of the Karnataka Bulldozers cricket team. He is a chairman of the Indian Institute of Cartoonists, and Managing Director of the Nandi Infrastructure Corridor Enterprises Limited based in Bengaluru. He was founder-president of the Karnataka Makkal Paksha until joining Indian National Congress party. He is the Director of IIIE Limited. He was Member of the Karnataka Legislative Assembly from Bidar South Vidhan Sabha constituency from 9 May 2013 to 15 May 2018.

He is a graduate of Electrical Engineering from National Institute of Technology Karnataka.

Kheny has been in the news for his scuffles with the former Prime Minister of India H. D. Deve Gowda over the land acquisition for the BMIC project.

Kheny received the Outstanding Businessman of the Year from a Minority community award for 1987, conferred by the then President of the United States Ronald Reagan.

Kheny owns the cricket team Karnataka Bulldozers in the Celebrity Cricket League.

Indian Institute of Cartoonists

In 2004, Kheny, an ardent admirer of cartoons, became an Honorary Chairman of the Indian Institute of Cartoonists. He dedicated the institute 5000 square feet of premises in the heart of Bangalore to establish the Indian Cartoon Gallery, the first of its kind in India.

References

External links 
 Highway project on schedule

Living people
1950 births
Businesspeople from Bangalore
Karnataka Janata Paksha politicians
Karnataka politicians
Karnataka MLAs 2013–2018
Indian National Congress politicians